Jaden Philogene-Bidace (born 8 February 2002), known as Jaden Philogene, is an English professional footballer who plays as a winger for EFL Championship side Cardiff City, on loan from Aston Villa. He is a product of the Aston Villa Academy and has represented England at youth level, he is currently a member of the under-20 squad.

Club career

Aston Villa
Philogene was signed by the Aston Villa academy from the Pro:Direct Academy in London in January 2018. He spent time on trial at a number of clubs in the English Football League, reportedly including Brentford, before settling at Villa.

After impressing for the Under-23 squad, and reportedly attracting the interest of Barcelona, Paris Saint-Germain and Borussia Dortmund, Philogene signed his first professional contract with Aston Villa.

On 19 May 2021, Philogene was given his first team debut, coming on as a late substitute in a 2–1 victory for Aston Villa against Tottenham Hotspur at the Tottenham Hotspur Stadium.

Stoke City (loan)
On 21 January 2022, Philogene joined EFL Championship side Stoke City on loan until the end of the 2021–22 season. The following day, Philogene made his Championship debut as a late substitute in a 3–2 home defeat to Fulham. Philogene played 11 times for Stoke, scoring once in a 3–0 win against Swansea City on 8 February 2022.

Cardiff City (loan) 
On 26 July 2022, Philogene joined EFL Championship side Cardiff City on loan until the end of the 2022–23 season. He made his debut for Cardiff on 6 August 2022, as a late substiute in a league defeat to Reading. Philogene scored his first goal for Cardiff on 13 August, the deciding goal in a 1–0 victory over Aston Villa's bitter rivals Birmingham City.

International career
On 17 November 2020, Philogene made his England U19 debut in a 8–0 friendly victory over Derby County U23s in which he scored a hat-trick.

On 6 September 2021, Philogene made his debut for the England U20s during a 6–1 victory over Romania U20s at St. George's Park.

Personal life
Philogene comes from London, and attended Uxbridge High School, where he was regularly named best football player.

Career statistics

References

External links
 
 

2002 births
Living people
Footballers from Greater London
English footballers
Association football wingers
England youth international footballers
Premier League players
English Football League players
Aston Villa F.C. players
Stoke City F.C. players
Cardiff City F.C. players
Black British sportspeople